Hamadan County is in Hamadan province, Iran. The capital of the county is the city of Hamadan. At the 2006 census, the county's population was 626,183 in 165,753 households. The following census in 2011 counted 651,821 people in 190,808 households, by which time Famenin District had been separated from the county to form Famenin County. At the 2016 census, the county's population was 676,105 in 210,775 households.

Administrative divisions

The population history and structural changes of Hamadan County's administrative divisions over three consecutive censuses are shown in the following table. The latest census shows two districts, nine rural districts, and four cities.

References

 

Counties of Hamadan Province